Will Power is an American playwright, rapper, actor, and educator.

Career
A pioneer in the genre of hip hop theatre, Power helped to create an influential new form of theater that fuses original music, rhymed dialogue, and choreography. His adaptation of the Greek tragedy Seven Against Thebes, entitled The Seven, had a successful Off-Broadway run at the New York Theatre Workshop.

Power is also the author of many well received plays. In January 2010 McCarter Theatre Center premiered Fetch Clay, Make Man. The play focuses on the relationship between Muhammad Ali, the famous boxer, and Stepin Fetchit, an African-American actor, on the eve of Ali's 1965 defense of his heavyweight championship against Sonny Liston.

In 2013, Power began a three-year term as the Playwright in Residence at Dallas Theater Center through the National Playwright Residency Program, funded by the Andrew W. Mellon Foundation and administered by HowlRound. In 2016, his residency grant was renewed for another three-year term.

His play Seize the King, an adaptation of Shakespeare's Richard III premiered at La Jolla Playhouse in 2018. It was produced at the Alliance Theatre in 2020, and with the Classical Theater of Harlem, where it received strong reviews including a Critics Pick from the New York Times.
Will Power's play "Detroit Red" about Malcolm X during his turbulent teenage years, played to full houses at Arts Emerson in Boston, and received five Elliot Norton Award nominations, winning two for Outstanding New Script (Will Power) and Outstanding Actor, Large Theater (Eric Berryman).

Power was a Doris Duke Foundation Resident Artist at New York Theatre Workshop, and on the Faculty at Southern Methodist University'Meadows School of the Arts.
Power is currently a professor at Occidental College in Los Angeles.

In addition to composing the music used in his shows, Power has also written lyrics and music heard on MTV, UPN's Moesha, and NBC's Kingpin. He was also the lead vocalist of the Omar Sosa Sextet from 1997-2000.

Power is the son of civil rights activists, Gigi Gregory and Chris Wylie, and the grandson of George Gregory, Jr.

Discography
With Midnight Voices- Albums: Dreams Keep Blowin' My Mind (1991), Late Nite at the Upper Room (1994), Howlin' at the Moon (1997)

As a member of the Omar Sosa Sextet-Free Roots (1997), Spirit of the Roots (1999), Bembón (2000), Prietos (2000).

Theatrical works
Written and performed:
2017, Cure No Cure (1997–98)
The Gathering (premiered 1999, toured through 2002)
Flow (premiered 2003, toured through 2005)

Performed:
Blessing the Boats

Written:
 Detroit Red
Seize the King
Honey Bo and the Goldmine
Fetch Clay Make Man
Steel Hammer (with Carl Hancock Rux, Kia Corthron, Regina Taylor, and SITI Company)
The Seven - Composed by Will Power, Will Hammond, and Justin Ellington
Five Fingers of Funk - Composed by Will Power and Justin Ellington
Stagger Lee - Composed by Will Power and Justin Ellington

Film/television appearances
Drylongso
All Men Are Sons
Carson Daly Show
Bill Moyers on Faith and Reason on PBS
Steven Colbert Report
Theatre Talk

Published works
Fetch Clay Make Man (Overlook Press, 2016)
Theater and Cultural Politics for a New World (Routledge Press, 2016)
Steel Hammer, Humana Festival 2014: The Complete Plays (Playscripts, Inc)
Selection from Fetch Clay, Make Man, 2014 Monologues for Actors of Color (Routledge Press)
Selection from Fetch Clay, Make Man, "The Best Stage Monologues of 2014) (Applause)
Five Fingers of Funk, "Fierce and True, Plays for Teen Audiences" (University of Minnesota Press, 2010)
Flow, "Plays from the Boom Box Galaxy: Theater from the Hip Hop Generation" (TCG, 2009)

References

 

 

American male stage actors
American dramatists and playwrights
African-American male actors
Year of birth missing (living people)
Living people
Place of birth missing (living people)
21st-century African-American people